FC Hlučín is a Czech football club based in Hlučín. It currently plays in the Moravian–Silesian Football League, which is the third tier of Czech football. The club played in the Czech 2. Liga for three seasons between 2005 and 2008, and returned for two more seasons in 2009–2010 and 2010–2011.

Historical names
 1923 – SK Hlučín (Sportovní klub Hlučín)
 1948 – Sokol Hlučín
 1953 – DSO Slavoj Hlučín
 1959 – TJ Hlučín
 1991 – FC Hlučín

Honours
Moravian–Silesian Football League (third tier)
 Champions 2008–09

References

External links
  Official website

 
Hlucin
Association football clubs established in 1923
Opava District